Nkechi Akashili (born 22 February 1990) is a Nigerian basketball player for First Bank B.C. and the Nigerian national team.

International career
She participated at the 2017 Women's Afrobasket.

References

External links

1990 births
Living people
Nigerian women's basketball players
Sportspeople from Warri
African Games silver medalists for Nigeria
African Games medalists in basketball
African Games bronze medalists for Nigeria
Guards (basketball)
Competitors at the 2011 All-Africa Games